7820 Dinmore Manor is a British Railways locomotive, part of the Manor Class. It is one of nine locomotives preserved from the class, which originally numbered 30.

Named after the ancient 12th century Knights Hospitaller preceptory Dinmore Manor in Herefordshire, the locomotive was built to a Great Western Railway design by British Railways in the ex-Great Western Works at Swindon in 1950, and was initially based at Oswestry. It was withdrawn from service in November 1965 from Shrewsbury, having been the last of its class to run with BR, and moved to Woodham Brothers scrapyard in Barry, Vale of Glamorgan, South Wales.

The locomotive was purchased in 1979 by the Gwili Railway and was moved to Bronwydd Arms for restoration. A lack of facilities and funds resulted in very little restoration work being carried out, with the locomotive being sold in 1983.

The engine was eventually restored at the Birmingham Railway Museum, with the West Somerset Railway Company providing a financial 'leg-up' to the owning Dinmore Manor Fund in 1995 to help finish the job. The engine then made its debut on the West Somerset Railway over the summer of 1995, and ran there for nearly 9 years.

The locomotive's first ten-year boiler certificate expired in July 2004, with the engine eventually returning to the Tyseley Locomotive Works for overhaul. This was completed in April 2014, and Dinmore Manor subsequently entered service at its new base at the Gloucestershire Warwickshire Railway.  While it remains based there, the locomotive has visited various other lines since resteaming.  In August and September 2014, it worked on the North Norfolk Railway, before revisiting the West Somerset Railway in October. The engine then visited the Great Central Railway at Loughborough in January & February 2015 before returning to the Gloucestershire Warwickshire Railway until July of that year, when the engine went on loan to the Dartmouth Steam Railway until the end of August, before visiting the Severn Valley Railway in November, where it ran alongside its GWR built sisters 7802 and 7812, to mark 50 years since all 3 were among the last 4 members of the class (along with fellow survivor 7821) to be withdrawn by BR in November 1965.

After returning to Toddington for the winter and up to June 2016, the loco was again loaned to the DSR during the summer before returning to the GWSR where it currently remains. It visited the Churnet Valley Railway for that line's 25th anniversary gala during October 2017.

Allocations

References

External links

 Dinmore Manor Locomotive Limited
 Great Western Archive

7820
Railway locomotives introduced in 1950
7820
Standard gauge steam locomotives of Great Britain